The Maly Cheremshan (literally, The Little Cheremshan, ; , Keçe Çirmeşän) is a river in Tatarstan and Ulyanovsk Oblast, Russian Federation, a right-bank tributary of the Bolshoy Cheremshan. It begins near Tatarsky Yeltan, Chistopolsky District, Tatarstan, and flows to the Bolshoy Cheremshan in Ulyanovsk Oblast.

Major tributaries are the Cheboksarka, Savrushka, Bagana, Adamka, Vyalyulkina, Baranka, Marasa, Ata, Shiya, Yukhmachka rivers. In its middle reaches the river crosses the biggest forest in Transkama Tatarstan. Since 1978 it is protected as a natural monument of Tatarstan.

References 

Rivers of Tatarstan
Rivers of Ulyanovsk Oblast